KPAN-FM (106.3 FM) is a radio station broadcasting a country-music format. KPAN-FM is licensed to serve the community of Hereford, Texas, United States. The station is currently owned by KPAN Broadcasters.

The 24-hour station simulcasts on KPAN AM, broadcasting at 860 kHz. It was founded as an AM station in 1948 by former State Senator Marshall Formby. Four generations of Formbys have an interest in the station. Clint Formby, a nephew of Marshall Formby, his son, Larry C. "Chip" Formby, and two grandsons, Jonathan and Lane Formby, are all involved in the station.

References

External links

PAN-FM
Country radio stations in the United States